Banira Giri (11 April 1946–24 May 2021) was a Nepalese poet and novelist, best known for her novels such as Karagar, Nirbandha and her poetry collections such as Jiwan: Thayamaru, Euta Jiundo Jung Bahadur, etc. In 1999, she received the Sajha Puraskar for her novel, Shabdatit Shantanu, becoming the first woman to win the prize.

She became the first woman to be awarded a Ph.D. by Tribhuvan University for her thesis on the poetry of Gopal Prasad Rimal in 1985.

Early life and education 
Giri was born on 11 April 1946 (29 Chaitra 2002 BS) in Kurseong, India. She studied in Darjeeling where she obtained an I.Sc. degree. Her future husband Shankar Giri had first seen her while she was studying in Darjeeling. She received her bachelor's degree from North Bengal University.

She traveled to Kathmandu in 1965 (2022 BS) for an award ceremony. A poetry competition was organized by the Royal Nepal Academy. She participated in the competition and stood second. The medals of the competition were distributed by the King Mahendra. While receiving the prize, she expressed her interest in pursuing an MA in Nepali literature from Tribhuvan University (TU) to the king. She then received an invitation from the Royal Secretariat to study at TU with scholarship.

Literary career 
She started teaching at Padma Kanya Campus after receiving her master's degree. She also taught at various colleges and campuses of the Tribhuvan University in her lifetime.

The university was initially reluctant on accepting the proposal of the thesis since Rimal had written few poems only but accepted after multiple request of Giri.

She is the second poet, after Laxmi Prasad Devkota, to represent Nepal in Afro-Asian Writers' Conference in 1975.

She published her first book Euta Jiundo Jung Bahadur, a poetry collection, in 1974 (Jestha 2031 BS). She received positive reviews for her work and published a second poetry collection titled Jiwan: Thayamaru, in 1977 (2034 BS).

Her third work was a novel titled Karagar, published in 1978. The novel is the story of a lonely woman living in Kathmandu. It deals with her relationship with her brothers after the death of their parents and her affair with a married man. The novel remains one of her widely-read works. In 1985 (2042 BS), she published the sequel of the novel titled Nirbandha.

In 1999 (2056 BS), she published a poetic fantasy novel titled Shabdatit Shantanu, for which she received the Sajha award.

Notable Works

Personal life and death 

She married Shankar Giri, an engineer from Janakpur in 1967. She was also one of the close friend of the writer Parijat.

On the night of May 24, 2021, Giri died following a heart attack and testing positive for COVID-19, at the age of 75. Giri was survived by her husband, a son and a daughter.

Awards and legacy 
She won the Sajha Puraskar in 1999 for her poetic fantasy work Shabatit Shantanu. She is the first woman to win the award. She was also awarded with Suprabal-Gorkha-Dakshin-Bahu, the second highest civilian honour in the Kingdom of Nepal by His Majesty's Government of Nepal.

Shankar Giri established a non-profit foundation called Banira Giri Foundation in 2019. The aim of the foundation is to help aspiring writers financially and in other ways. The foundation also have an archive of the books, manuscripts and photographs of the poet. A life-size statue of Giri was built on the property of the foundation which was unveiled on 11 May 2022 by Dr. Basudev Tripathi.

The foundation also presented various awards to poets and artist on that day.

References

External links
 Banira Giri at Poetry International
 Banira Giri at 

1946 births
2021 deaths
Nepalese women poets
Nepali-language writers
People from Darjeeling district
Tribhuvan University alumni
21st-century Nepalese poets
21st-century Nepalese women writers
Deaths from the COVID-19 pandemic in Nepal
Sajha Puraskar winners
Khas people